Uubusin Ko ang Lahi Mo is a 1991 Philippine political action drama film edited and directed by Pepe Marcos. The film stars Phillip Salvador, Maricel Laxa, Robert Arevalo and Eddie Gutierrez.

Plot
The Canonigos led by Mayor Placido (Eddie) have enjoyed sole political control of the town of Sto. Niño for several years. But, their abusive reign is threatened when Fortunato Guerrero (Robert) plans to run for town mayor.

Cast
 Phillip Salvador as Peping Guerrero
 Maricel Laxa as Helen
 Robert Arevalo as Fortunato Guerrero
 Marita Zobel as Pacita Guerrero
 Eddie Gutierrez as Mayor Placido Canonigo
 Michael de Mesa as Frank
 Kevin Delgado as Eddie Boy
 Atoy Co as Jun
 Cathy Mora as Joanna
 Benedict Aquino as Renato
 Eric Francisco as Rupert
 Jeena Alvarez as Neneng
 Dencio Padilla as Mang Bernardo
 Madel Locsin as Estela
 Johnny Vicar as Provincial Commander
 Zandro Zamora as Police Chief
 Nanding Fernandez as Police Chief
 Evelyn Loreto as Mayor's Wife
 Jojo Lapus as Ariston
 Vangie Labalan as Ariston's Wife

Awards

References

External links

1991 films
1991 action films
Filipino-language films
Philippine action films
Philippine political films
Moviestars Production films